The eighteenth season of the American television medical drama Grey's Anatomy was ordered on May 10, 2021, by the American Broadcasting Company (ABC). It premiered on September 30, 2021, for the 2021–22 broadcast season. The season is produced by ABC Signature, in association with Shondaland Production Company and Entertainment One Television; the showrunner being Krista Vernoff.

This is the first season not to feature Jesse Williams, Giacomo Gianniotti, and Greg Germann as series regulars since the seventh, twelfth, and sixteenth seasons, respectively. The season marked the return of Kate Walsh as Addison Montgomery for three episodes, after her last appearance on the season 8 episode "If/Then". On January 10, 2022, ABC renewed the series for a nineteenth season.

Episodes 

The number in the "No. overall" column refers to the episode's number within the overall series, whereas the number in the "No. in season" column refers to the episode's number within this particular season. "U.S. viewers in millions" refers to the number of Americans in millions who watched the episodes live.

Cast and characters

Main 

 Ellen Pompeo as Dr. Meredith Grey
 Chandra Wilson as Dr. Miranda Bailey
 James Pickens Jr. as Dr. Richard Webber
 Kevin McKidd as Dr. Owen Hunt
 Caterina Scorsone as Dr. Amelia Shepherd
 Camilla Luddington as Dr. Jo Wilson
 Kelly McCreary as Dr. Maggie Pierce
 Kim Raver as Dr. Teddy Altman
 Jake Borelli as Dr. Levi Schmitt
 Chris Carmack as Dr. Atticus "Link" Lincoln
 Richard Flood as Dr. Cormac Hayes
 Anthony Hill as Dr. Winston Ndugu
 Scott Speedman as Dr. Nick Marsh

Recurring 

 Abigail Spencer as Dr. Megan Hunt
 Lynn Chen as Dr. Michelle Lin
 Alex Landi as Dr. Nico Kim
 Melissa DuPrey as Dr. Sara Ortiz
 Greg Tarzan Davis as Dr. Jordan Wright
 Peter Gallagher as Dr. David Hamilton
 Jaicy Elliot as Dr. Taryn Helm
 E.R. Fightmaster as Dr. Kai Bartley
 Zaiver Sinnett as Dr. Zander Perez
 Sylvia Kwan as Dr. Mabel Tseng
 Robert I. Mesa as Dr. James Chee
 Kate Walsh as Dr. Addison Montgomery
 Jason George as Dr. Ben Warren
 Stefania Spampinato as Dr. Carina DeLuca
 Aniela Gumbs as Zola Grey Shepherd  
 Debbie Allen as Dr. Catherine Fox
 Skylar Astin as Todd Eames
 Rome Flynn as Wendell Ndugu
 Kate Burton as Dr. Ellis Grey
 Bianca A. Santos as Kristen Clark
 Cedric Sanders as Simon Clark

Notable guests 
 Debra Mooney as Evelyn Hunt
 Greg Germann as Dr. Tom Koracick
 Jaina Lee Ortiz as Lt. Andy Herrera
 Grey Damon as Lt. Jack Gibson
 Barrett Doss as Victoria "Vic" Hughes
 Jay Hayden as Travis Montgomery
 Okieriete Onaodowan as Dean Miller
 Carlos Miranda as Lt. Theo Ruiz
 LaTanya Richardson Jackson as Diane Pierce 
 Sarah Drew as Dr. April Kepner
 Jesse Williams as Dr. Jackson Avery

Production

Development
On March 25, 2021, Krista Vernoff, who serves as the showrunner and executive producer of Grey's Anatomy and Station 19 signed a two-year deal with ABC to remain on both series through a potential nineteenth season. The deal also keeps Trip the Light Productions, Vernoff's production company, attached to the series. Although no longer writing for the series, after her departure from ABC to Netflix in 2017, series creator Shonda Rhimes remains credited as a showrunner and executive producer. When ABC revealed its schedule for the 2021–22 broadcast season it was announced that the series would hold its previous time slot of Thursdays at 9:00 PM ET, with Station 19 serving as a lead-in. ABC announced its holiday programming schedule in October 2021, where it was revealed that the season would contain both a Thanksgiving and Christmas themed episode to air in November and December, respectively. The season finale was also the series' 400th episode.

Casting
Kim Raver, Camilla Luddington, and Kevin McKidd each signed a three-year contract in July 2020 keeping them attached to the series through a potential nineteenth season to portray Dr. Teddy Altman, Dr. Jo Wilson, and Dr. Owen Hunt, respectively. The series remaining three original actors Ellen Pompeo, Chandra Wilson, and James Pickens, Jr., who portray Dr. Meredith Grey, Dr. Miranda Bailey, and Dr. Richard Webber, respectively, were all confirmed to be returning for the season. Her contract also allows her to retain a producer credit on the series as well as co-executive producer credit on Station 19. Wilson and Pickens reportedly received a significant pay increase from their previous contracts. Giacomo Gianniotti, Jesse Williams, and Greg Germann did not return as series regulars to portray Dr. Andrew DeLuca, Dr. Jackson Avery, and Dr. Tom Koracick, respectively, after departing in the previous season. Meanwhile, Scott Speedman was added to the main cast as Dr. Nick Marsh, a character he had previously portrayed in the fourteenth season as a guest star.

Former series regular Kate Walsh, who also headlined her own spin-off series entitled Private Practice from 2007 until 2013, returned to the series in a recurring capacity. Walsh, who portrays the character Dr. Addison Montgomery, returned in the third episode, "Hotter Than Hell", and had last guest starred in the eighth season episode "If/Then" in 2012. She then appeared in "With a Little Help From My Friends", the episode that immediately followed; and again in Should I Stay or Should I Go". Despite his departure in the seventeenth season, it was reported that Germann was expected to return in later seasons as a guest star which he later did, reprising his role in "Bottle Up and Explode!" and once more in "Legacy." Richard Flood departed as a series regular after the tenth episode of the season, "Living in a House Divided"; Flood was first introduced as a recurring character during the sixteenth season and was promoted to the main cast beginning with the seventeenth. Williams, who previously departed alongside Germann, stated in an interview that he would be open to returning during the season as well. In April 2022 it was confirmed that Williams would return to the series in the season finale alongside former co-star Sarah Drew. Drew portrayed Dr. April Kepner beginning in the sixth season and held the role for nine seasons, eight as a series regular, before departing in the fourteenth season, and briefly returning in the previous season for Williams' departure.

The season also featured the return of recurring cast members Kate Burton as Dr. Ellis Grey and Abigail Spencer as Dr. Megan Hunt, both of whom last appeared in the fifteenth season. New cast members to the series who were cast in recurring roles for the season include Peter Gallagher as Dr. David Hamilton, Lynn Chen as Dr. Michelle Lin, and Greg Tarzan Davis as Dr. Jordan Wright. E.R. Fightmaster, who had guest starred in the season’s second and third episodes as Dr. Kai Bartley, was also promoted to a recurring cast member. Fightmaster and their character Bartley are both non-binary, being the first non-binary actor and character on the series. Skylar Astin and Rome Flynn were cast in recurring roles for the second half of the season to portray Todd Eames, an environmental sciences expert, and Wendell Ndugu, the brother of Hill's character, respectively. Bianca A. Santos and Cedric Sanders were also cast in recurring roles to portray Kristen and Simon Clark, a "married couple in a dire medical situation," for three episodes of the season.

Reception

Awards and nominations
At the 2nd Hollywood Critics Association TV Awards the season received a nomination for Best Broadcast Network Series, Drama. This award was ultimately won by This Is Us. The season was also awarded The ReFrame Stamp, a certification given to scripted television productions that hire "women or individuals of other underrepresented gender identities/expressions [...] in four out of eight key roles including writer, director, producer, lead, co-leads, and department heads."

Ratings

Notes

References 

Grey's Anatomy seasons
2021 American television seasons
2022 American television seasons